Ingersoll Township is a civil township of Midland County in the U.S. state of Michigan.  The population was 3,018 at the 2000 census.

Communities
It is at the corners of sections 25, 26, 35, and 36 in the southeast corner of both the township and county. The community first got a post office in January 1874 with the name Lee's Corner, after a local landowner. The post office was renamed Laporte in April 1895 and closed in January 1910.
 The city of Midland lies just north of the township, and has incorporated a small area of land in northeast corner of the township.
It is at the corners of sections 8, 9, 16, and 17. A post office opened in July 1898 and operated until January 1907.

Geography

Demographics
As of the census of 2000, there were 3,018 people, 1,067 households, and 837 families residing in the township. The racial makeup of the township was 97.68% White, 0.33% African American, 0.13% Native American, 0.27% Asian, 0.60% from other races, and 0.99% from two or more races. Hispanic or Latino of any race were 1.79% of the population.

There were 1,067 households, out of which 36.0% had children under the age of 18 living with them, 68.0% were married couples living together, 6.8% had a female householder with no husband present, and 21.5% were non-families. 17.9% of all households were made up of individuals, and 8.7% had someone living alone who was 65 years of age or older.  The average household size was 2.70 and the average family size was 3.04.

In the township the population was spread out, with 26.1% under the age of 18, 6.7% from 18 to 24, 29.3% from 25 to 44, 21.9% from 45 to 64, and 15.9% who were 65 years of age or older.  The median age was 38 years. For every 100 females, there were 95.1 males.  For every 100 females age 18 and over, there were 91.7 males.

The median income for a household in the township was $49,673, and the median income for a family was $55,050. Males had a median income of $41,458 versus $30,385 for females. The per capita income for the township was $22,249.  About 3.5% of families and 6.1% of the population were below the poverty line, including 7.3% of those under age 18 and 8.9% of those age 65 or over.

References

Townships in Midland County, Michigan
Townships in Michigan
1855 establishments in Michigan
Populated places established in 1855